The 2013–14 Portland Pilots women's basketball team represented the University of Portland in the 2013–14 college basketball season. It was head coach Jim Sollar's twenty-seventh and final season at Portland. The Pilots were members of the West Coast Conference and played their home games at the Chiles Center.

Before the season
Pre-season Predictions will be announced at the 2013 WCC Media Day sometime in October.

Roster

Schedule and results
Source:

|-
!colspan=9 style="background:#FFFFFF; color:#461D7C;"| Exhibition

|-
!colspan=9 style="background:#461D7C; color:#FFFFFF;"| Regular Season

|-
!colspan=9 style="background:#FFFFFF; color:#461D7C;"| 2014 West Coast Conference women's basketball tournament

Game Summaries

Exhibition: Concordia

Eastern Washington

Oregon

Washington

Montana

Seattle

Columbia
Series History: First Meeting

Oregon State
Series History: Oregon State leads 16-4

Boise State
Series History: Portland leads 11-5

Fresno State
Series History: Portland leads 1-0

Cal Poly
Series History: Cal Poly leads 4-1

Portland State
Series History: Portland leads 25-24

Pacific
Series History: Portland leads 6-2

Saint Mary's
Series History: Saint Mary's leads 36-20

Gonzaga
Series History: Gonzaga leads 40-27

San Diego
Series History: San Diego leads 32-31

BYU
Series History: BYU leads series 12-4

Santa Clara
Series History: Santa Clara leads 34-29

San Francisco
Series History: Portland leads 30-26

Pepperdine
Series History: Pepperdine leads series 34-22 
Broadcaster: Josh Perigo

Loyola Marymount
Series History: Loyola Marymount leads 34-22

San Francisco
Series History: Portland leads 31-26

Santa Clara
Series History: Santa Clara leads 35-29

Loyola Marymount
Series History: Loyola Marymount leads 35-22

Pepperdine
Series History: Pepperdine leads series 34-23

BYU
Series History: BYU leads series 13-4
Broadcasters: Spencer Linton, Kristen Kozlowski & Jake Edmonds

San Diego
Series History: Series even 32-32

Portland
Series History: Gonzaga leads 41-27

Pacific
Series History: Portland leads 7-2

Rankings

See also
Portland Pilots women's basketball

References

Portland
Portland Pilots women's basketball seasons